Lee Seon-hee is a South Korean actress.  She is known for her roles in dramas such as When the Weather Is Fine, When the Camellia Blooms, 100 Days My Prince and Do Do Sol Sol La La Sol.  She also appeared in movies Casa Amor: Exclusive for Ladies, Alienoid, The Attorney, Sisters on the Road, Seondal: The Man Who Sells the River and The Wailing.

Filmography

Television series

Web series

Film

Awards and nominations

References

External links 
 
 

1978 births
Living people
21st-century South Korean actresses
South Korean television actresses
South Korean film actresses